John George Gill (1854 – 14 March 1888) was a New Zealand cricketer. He played six first-class matches for Auckland between 1882 and 1885.

Gill was born in Durham, England. His father was a run-holder in New South Wales. Gill had a farm at Takapuna, which was then on the outskirts of Auckland, where he died suddenly of an apoplexy.

See also
 List of Auckland representative cricketers

References

External links
 

1854 births
1888 deaths
New Zealand cricketers
Auckland cricketers
Sportspeople from Durham, England
Cricketers from County Durham
English emigrants to New Zealand